Martina (Greek: Μαρτίνα; died after 641) was an empress of the Byzantine Empire, the second wife of her uncle the emperor Heraclius, and regent in 641 with her son. She was a daughter of Maria, Heraclius' sister, and a certain Martinus. Maria and Heraclius were children of Heraclius the Elder and his wife Epiphania according to the chronicle of Theophanes the Confessor.

Empress
Eudokia, the first wife of Heraclius, died on 13 August 612. According to the Chronographikon syntomon of Ecumenical Patriarch Nikephoros I of Constantinople, the cause of death was epilepsy.

According to Theophanes, Martina married her maternal uncle not long after, placing the marriage in 613 at the latest. However, Nikephoros places the marriage during the wars with the Eurasian Avars which took place in the 620s.

The marriage was considered to fall within the prohibited degree of kinship, according to the rules of Chalcedonian Christianity concerning incest. This particular case of marriage between an uncle and a niece had been declared illegal since the time of the Codex Theodosianus. Thus the marriage was disapproved by the people of Constantinople and the Church. The unpopularity of the marriage was further exacerbated by the populace's adoration for the previous empress.

Despite his disapproval and attempts to convince Heraclius to repudiate Martina, Patriarch Sergius I of Constantinople performed the ceremony himself and crowned Martina in the Augustaeum after she was proclaimed augusta by Heraclius. Even the members of the imperial family voiced their objections, with Heraclius' brother (and Martina's uncle) Theodore continually criticizing Heraclius by pointing out that his sin 'is continually before him' in reference to Martina and their offspring.

The emperor and the empress were, however, clearly a close couple: Martina accompanied her husband in his most difficult campaigns against the Sassanid Empire. She was also at his side at Antioch when the news was received of the serious defeat by the Arabs at the river Yarmuk in August 636. These defeats would haunt Martina through her regency and make her increasingly unpopular. Her unpopularity with the people of Constantinople may have possibly led to her removal from coinage in 629. However, other scholars advise caution against such a view, as her disappearance in coinage came at the same time as Heraclius' major monetary reform.

Regent
On his deathbed in 641, Heraclius left the empire to both his son from the first marriage, Heraclius Constantine and Heraklonas (as Heraclius II), his sons with Martina, granting them equal rank. Martina was to be honoured as empress and mother of both of them.

Heraclius died on 11 February 641 of an edema which Nikephoros considered a divine punishment for his sinful marriage. Three days later Martina took the initiative in announcing the contents of Heraclius' will in a public ceremony. The authority for such a ceremony typically belonged to the succeeding emperor, not to the empress. Martina was attempting to establish her own authority over the two co-emperors.

The ceremony took place in the Hippodrome of Constantinople. Present were members of the Byzantine Senate, other dignitaries and the crowds of Constantinople. Absent were both Constantine and Heraklonas. Martina read the contents of the will and claimed the senior authority in the Empire for herself. However the crowd instead acclaimed the names of the two emperors and not her own, thus objecting to her assumption of imperial authority. She was forced to return to the palace in defeat.

Relations of Martina and her stepson were always difficult. When Heraclius Constantine died suddenly of tuberculosis only four months later, the common belief was that the empress poisoned him to leave Heraklonas as sole ruler. However historians like Herren and Garland have stated that this is most likely not true. Martina began immediately to exile the prominent supporters of Constantine and with the help of Patriarch Pyrrhus I of Constantinople, one of her primary advisors, revived the policy of monothelitism. She recalled Bishop Cyrus of Alexandria and sent him to Egypt after his exile, showing her dedication to the policy of monothelitism.

Downfall and deposition 
Her actions and the rumors of poisoning Heraclius Constantine caused the people and the Senate to turn against Martina and her son. The Armenian Valentinus with the troops from Asia Minor, marched to Chalcedon and a frightened Heraklonas named Constans II, son of late Heraclius Constantine, a co-emperor.

After September 641 there was a huge revolt and the army ransacked the harvest on the Asiatic side of the Bosphoros. That month, Martina lost the support of one of her devout followers, Pyrrhus of Constantinople, who abandoned the city after being repeatedly assaulted and followed. This left her vulnerable to the Senate who despised her.

In November 641, their downfall was completed as the army marched on Constantinople and captured Martina and her three sons, Heraklonas, David and Marinos. Martina's tongue was slit, her sons had their noses cut off, and her youngest sons were castrated. Eventually they were sent to Rhodes.

Analysis 
Lynda Garland completed a comprehensive study of Byzantine empresses, covering Martina extensively. She summarised that Empress Martina was a 'scapegoat' for the failure against Arab expansion as well as the continuation of her husband's policies of monothelitism. Martina's ambition for her family did cause resentment amongst the people of Constantinople. However, she continued the legacy of providing and fighting for her heirs, similarly to many other Byzantine empresses.

Children
Martina and Heraclius had at least 10 children, though the names and order of these children are questions for debate:
 Constantine. Named a caesar in 615. Died young.
 Fabius, who had a paralyzed neck. Died young.
 Theodosios, who was a deaf-mute, married Nike, daughter of Persian general Shahrbaraz.
 Heracleonas, emperor 638–641.
 David (Tiberios) (born on 7 November 630), proclaimed caesar in 638. He was briefly proclaimed augustus and co-emperor with Heraklonas and Constans in 641. Deposed, mutilated and exiled to Rhodes.
 Marinus. A caesar. Possibly the youngest son that died after being emasculated according to John of Nikiu.
 Augoustina. Proclaimed an augusta in 638.
 Anastasia and/or Martina. Proclaimed augusta in 638.
 Febronia.

Of these at least two were disabled, which was seen as punishment for the illegality of the marriage and may have been a consequence of inbreeding.

References

Bibliography
 
 
Garland, L., Byzantine Empresses : Women and Power in Byzantium AD 527-1204 (Routledge, 2002).

External links
An article on Martina by Lynda Garland

6th-century births
7th-century deaths
Heraclian dynasty
7th-century Byzantine empresses
Augustae
Heraclius
Byzantine exiles
7th-century women rulers
Mothers of Byzantine emperors